Mangcongco is an inkhundla of Eswatini, located in the Manzini District.  Its population as of the 2007 census was 6,603.

References
Statoids.com, retrieved December 11, 2010

Populated places in Manzini Region